"Love on My Mind" is the title of the fourth R&B single by the group Xscape.  In the U.S., the song reached number 46 on the Billboard Hot 100 and number 16 on the R&B Singles chart.

Formats and track listings
CD single
Love on my Mind (JD street mix) – 4:05
Love on my Mind (Allstar remix) – 4:50
Love on my Mind – 3:49
Love on my Mind (JD extended street mix) – 5:54
Love on my Mind (JD extended club) – 5:44
Love on my Mind (JD street mix w/o rap) – 3:52

Cassette single
Love on My Mind (LP version)
Love on My Mind (with rap)

7" 45rpm vinyl single
A1 – Love on My Mind (LP version) – 3:48
B1 – Love on My Mind (with rap)

12" 33-1/3rpm vinyl single

Side A

 Love on my Mind (JD street mix) – 4:05
 Love on my Mind (Allstar remix) – 4:50
 Love on my Mind – 3:49

Side B

 Love on my Mind (JD extended street mix) – 5:54
 Love on my Mind (JD extended club) – 5:44
 Love on my Mind (JD street mix w/o rap) – 3:52

Charts

Weekly charts

Year-end charts

References

1993 singles
Xscape (group) songs
Song recordings produced by Jermaine Dupri
Songs written by Jermaine Dupri
Songs written by Manuel Seal
New jack swing songs
1993 songs
So So Def Recordings singles